MV The Lady Patricia was a vessel in the Guinness shipping fleet.

History 
The Lady Patricia was built by Charles Hill & Sons of Bristol as a replacement for The Guinness. She was launched in November 1962 by Lady Patrica Lennox-Boyd Guinness, wife of former British  Cabinet Minister Alan Tindal Lennox-Boyd, daughter of Rupert Guinness, 2nd Earl of Iveagh and Gwendolen Guinness, Countess of Iveagh.

In 1973 she was converted into a tanker.

In April 1993 she sailed out of Dublin port for the last time, to the Manchester Ship Canal, where she was sold. In April 1993 she was scrapped.

Filming 
In Far and Away she was used as the emigrant ship and in Hear My Song she was used as the mailboat.

References 

Ships built in Bristol
1962 ships
Ships of the Republic of Ireland
Tankers of the Republic of Ireland